Boris de Fast (July 6, 1890 - ?after 1966) was a Russian actor, screenwriter, film editor and make-up artist. Born in Feodosia, Crimea in the Russian Empire, he emigrated to France where he worked in the county's film industry. His only American film was a strange villainous performance in Tempest(1928).

Selected filmography

Actor
 Michel Strogoff (1926)
 En plongée (1926)
 Napoleon (1927)
 Princess Masha (1927)
 The Woman Disputed (1928)
 Tempest (1928)
 Madonna of the Sleeping Cars (1928)
 Volga Volga (1928)
 Land Without Women (1929)
 The Ship of Lost Souls (1929)
 The Ring of the Empress (1930)
 La Femme d'une nuit (1931)
 Queen of the Night (1931)
 The Man with a Broken Ear (1934)

Editor
 Les yeux noirs (1935)
 The Lie of Nina Petrovna (1937)
 Adrienne Lecouvreur (1938)

Screenwriter
 Volga in Flames (1934)

References

Bibliography
 Waldman, Harry. Maurice Tourneur: The Life and Films. McFarland, 2001.

External links

1890 births
Year of death unknown
Male actors from the Russian Empire
French male film actors
Emigrants from the Russian Empire to France
People from Feodosia